Aemilia (minor planet designation: 159 Aemilia) is a large main-belt asteroid. Aemilia was discovered by the French brothers Paul Henry and Prosper Henry on January 26, 1876. The credit for this discovery was given to Paul. It is probably named after the Via Aemilia, a Roman road in Italy that runs from Piacenza to Rimini.

This slowly rotating, dark asteroid has a primitive carbonaceous composition, based upon its classification as a C-type asteroid. Photometric observations made in 2006 gave a rotation period of about 25  hours. Subsequent observations made at the Oakley Observatory in Terre Haute, Indiana found a light curve period of 16.37 ± 0.02 hours, with variation in brightness of 0.24 ± 0.04 in magnitude.

It orbits within the Hygiea family, although it may be an unrelated interloping asteroid, as it is too big to have arisen from the cratering process that most probably  produced that family. Three stellar occultations by Aemilia have been recorded so far, the first in 2001, the second in 2003 and the third in 2016

References

External links 
 
 

000159
Discoveries by Paul Henry and Prosper Henry
Named minor planets
000159
000159
000159
18760126